FlixMix is a puzzle video game developed and published by Celeris. The game focuses on solving jigsaw-like puzzles with animated images.

Gameplay 

The object of the game is to place all the rectangular pieces into the correct positions. Puzzle pieces can be varied in size to as few as 2x2 to over 10x10, depending on the puzzle. Additional options to increase difficulty include mirrored or flipped pieces, locking correctly placed pieces, blanking placed pieces after a time delay, and occasionally playing the video clip in reverse.

There are four game modes in FlixMix. In Single Mingle, the player has unlimited time to solve a single puzzle. In Scramblecade, the player rotates through all the puzzles in a tileset, with the pieces shrinking in size almost each round. The player has a time limit, which can be extended by placing pieces, placing pieces in bonus spaces worth extra time and points, and solving puzzles. In Joint Venture, up to nine players take turns solving a sequence of puzzles with the winner being the one to solve the most puzzles within a time limit. In Mix'n'Match, up to nine players take turns solving the same puzzle in sequence, with the player with the lowest time declared the winner.

Tilesets 

The puzzles are divided into two tilesets of nine puzzles each. Each puzzle has its own background music. In the shareware version, only the first puzzle in each tileset is playable, though all puzzles can be viewed by watching a gameplay demo.

Tileset #001: Fit To Be Tiled

Tileset #002: Grid Riddlers

References

External links

1993 video games
DOS games
NEC PC-9801 games
Puzzle video games
Video games developed in the United States
Video games scored by Takeshi Abo